Let It Breed is the third studio album by noise rock band The Honeymoon Killers, released in 1986 by Fur Records.

Release and reception 

Kathleen C. Fennessy of allmusic gave the album two and a half out of five stars, saying the band sounded like "the Cramps without the rockabilly or Pussy Galore without the metallic drum kit." Critics of the Trouser Press said the band successfully reduces the "musical insanity a tad without giving up any of their intensity."

Track listing

Personnel 
Adapted from the Let It Breed liner notes.

The Honeymoon Killers
 Sally Edroso – drums, vocals
 Jerry Teel – electric guitar, harmonica, vocals, cover art, illustrations
 Lisa Wells – bass guitar, vocals

Production and additional personnel
 The Honeymoon Killers – production
 Kramer – engineering
 Steve McAllister – engineering

Release history

References

External links 
 Let It Breed at Discogs (list of releases)

1986 albums
The Honeymoon Killers (American band) albums
Albums produced by Kramer (musician)